Lieutenant-General Sir Ronald MacKenzie Scobie,  (8 June 1893 – 23 February 1969) was a senior British Army officer who fought in both the First and Second World Wars, where he commanded the 70th Infantry Division and later III Corps. He was also a Scotland international rugby union player.

Military career

Scobie was educated at Cheltenham College and the Royal Military Academy, Woolwich.

First World War

He was commissioned into the Royal Engineers in 1914 and served during the First World War on the Western Front in France and Belgium. He was a General Staff Officer Grade 3 in France in 1918, and a Brigade Major in France from 1918 to 1920.

Between the wars

After the war, Scobie became Officer, Company of Gentlemen Cadets, Royal Marine Artillery, Woolwich 1920–1924; Staff Captain, Aldershot Command 1927–1929; Brigade Major, Aldershot Command 1929–1931 After attending the Staff College, Camberley from 1925 to 1926, he became Director of Military Artillery at the Royal Military College, Duntroon in 1932 and, after attending the Imperial Defence College, was Assistant Adjutant General at the War Office in 1938.

Second World War

In 1939, at the outbreak of the Second World War Scobie, a brigadier, was deputy director of Mobilisation at the War Office. After this he held the position Deputy Adjutant General at General Headquarters, Middle East Land Forces in 1940 before being given command of the 70th Infantry Division, which was sent in to relieve the Australian 9th Division in Tobruk. Scobie was in command of the Tobruk fortress from 22 October 1941 to 13 December 1941, when, as part of Operation Crusader, the 70th Infantry Division led the break-out from Tobruk. In 1942 he became General Officer Commanding the Troops in Malta and on 22 March 1943 Scobie was promoted to lieutenant general and made Chief of the General Staff at General Headquarters Middle East. From 11 December 1943 he was given command of III Corps which was sent to Greece to expel the Germans but ended up becoming involved in the Greek Civil War. He remained in command of British forces in Greece until 1946, retiring from the army in 1947.

Rugby Union career

Amateur career

He played rugby union for the Royal Military College.

He played for the Army Rugby Union against the Royal Navy Rugby Union in the 1914 Inter-Services match.

Provincial career

He played for the Blues Trial side against the Whites Trial side on 10 January 1914.

International career

He was capped three times by Scotland, all in 1914.

Other sports

He played cricket for Cheltenham College and for the Royal Engineers.

References

Bibliography

External links

WWII Peoples War: Force 140
British Army Officers 1939–1945
Generals of World War II

|-

|-

1893 births
1969 deaths
Graduates of the Royal College of Defence Studies
British Army generals of World War II
British Army personnel of World War I
Companions of the Order of the Bath
Graduates of the Royal Military Academy, Woolwich
Graduates of the Staff College, Camberley
Knights Commander of the Order of the British Empire
People educated at Cheltenham College
People from Mandalay
People of the Greek Civil War
Recipients of the Military Cross
Royal Engineers officers
War Office personnel in World War II
Blues Trial players
Scotland international rugby union players
Scottish rugby union players
Army rugby union players
British Army lieutenant generals
Academics of the Royal Military Academy, Woolwich
Academics of the Royal Military College, Sandhurst
Rugby union centres